Robert Bradlaw (born Reuven Brudno; 22 February 1840 – ?) was a dentist and prominent Jewish leader in Dublin, Ireland.

Background
Bradlaw was born Robert Brudno in Smorgon, Belarus on 22 February 1840. He moved to England in 1867 and then to Dublin, Ireland, in 1880.

Community work
Bradlaw was active in the Dublin Jewish community and was affectionately nicknamed "the prince of the immigrants". He established a synagogue at 7 St. Kevin's Parade (Machzikei Hadass orthodox congregation which more inline with the practices of the eastern european jews moving to Ireland in the late 19th century) in 1883 and a new chevra kadisha and cemetery at Dolphin's Barn in 1898 (where he himself was buried), replacing the Ballybough Cemetery. The Jewish Chronicle reported that Bradlaw formed the synagogue to break away from the Dublin Hebrew Congregation which had reportedly denied him membership. He obtained donations of £300 to fund the chevra. Bradlaw participated in the foundation ceremony for the opening of Adelaide Road Synagogue in 1892.

Family
Bradlaw's grandson, Professor Robert Vivian Bradlaw (1905–1992), was a renowned dentist who founded the Faculty of Dental Surgery of the Royal College of Surgeons of England and served as Dean of the Eastman Dental Hospital from 1959 to 1970. His son-in-law Dr George Selig Wigoder was a Talmudic scholar.

References

Jews and Judaism in Ireland
1840 births
Irish dentists
Irish Jews
People from Dublin (city) in health professions
Year of death missing
Emigrants from the Russian Empire to the United Kingdom
Burials at Dolphins Barn Jewish Cemetery